Cynthiana may refer to:
 Cynthiana, Kentucky, a city in Harrison County, Kentucky, United States
 the Cynthiana meteorite of 1877, which fell in Kentucky, United States (see meteorite falls)
 Cynthiana, Indiana, a town in Posey County, Indiana, United States
 Cynthiana, Ohio, a town in Pike County, Ohio, United States
 Norton (grape), also known as the Cynthiana grape.